Siaka Bamba (born 24 August 1989), is an Ivorian footballer who plays as a defensive midfielder for C.D. Fátima.

Career
In the summer of 2013, Bamba rejoined former side Desportivo de Chaves.

Whilst at Feirense, Bamba won the SJPF Segunda Liga Player of the Month for March 2011.

Bamba represented his country at the 2005 FIFA U-17 World Championship. During the tournament which saw his side finish bottom of their group, Bamba scored a goal for his country in a 1–1 draw with the United States.

In 2018–19, he signed in for Recreativo do Libolo in Angola's premier league, the Girabola.

Honours

Club
Desportivo de Chaves
 Taça de Portugal: Runners-up 2009–10

Vitória de Guimarães
 Taça de Portugal: 2012–13

Individual
 SJPF Segunda Liga Player of the Month: March 2011

References

External links

1989 births
Living people
Footballers from Abidjan
Ivorian footballers
Ivorian expatriate footballers
Association football midfielders
Primeira Liga players
Liga Portugal 2 players
Cypriot First Division players
Segunda Divisão players
G.D. Chaves players
C.D. Feirense players
C.R.D. Libolo players
Vitória S.C. players
C.D. Cova da Piedade players
Nea Salamis Famagusta FC players
S.U. Sintrense players
C.D. Fátima players
Ivorian expatriate sportspeople in Portugal
Ivorian expatriate sportspeople in Cyprus
Expatriate footballers in Portugal
Expatriate footballers in Cyprus
Expatriate footballers in Angola
Ivory Coast youth international footballers